The Don Beds is a geologic formation in Ontario. It preserves fossils.

See also

 List of fossiliferous stratigraphic units in Ontario

References
 

Geology of Ontario